John Robertson Porteous (5 December 1921 – 13 August 2007) was a Scottish footballer who played as a wing half.

He began his career as a footballer with Motherwell F.C., but did not make a league appearance before joining Alloa Athletic in 1948. A year later, he moved to England to play for Plymouth Argyle, under the management of fellow countryman Jimmy Rae. A versatile player, Porteous was instrumental in the team that won the Third Division South championship in the 1951–52 season, and remained a regular name in the side until 1955. After making 221 appearances in all competitions, scoring 13 goals, he joined Exeter City in 1956, before finishing his career in non-league football with Truro City.

Honours
Plymouth Argyle
Football League Third Division South: 1951–52

References

1921 births
Footballers from Motherwell
Scottish footballers
Motherwell F.C. players
Alloa Athletic F.C. players
Plymouth Argyle F.C. players
Exeter City F.C. players
Truro City F.C. players
Scottish Football League players
English Football League players
2007 deaths
Association football wing halves